Litoporus iguassuensis is a cellar spider species found in Brazil.

References

Pholcidae
Spiders of Brazil
Endemic fauna of Brazil
Spiders described in 1918